Daniel Klein (born  1976) is an American computer scientist and professor of computer science at the University of California, Berkeley. His research focuses on natural language processing and artificial intelligence.

He was educated at Mt. Lebanon High School in Mt. Lebanon Township, Pennsylvania and earned a BA in mathematics, computer science, and linguistics by Cornell University (1998), a Master of Studies (MSt) in linguistics by Oxford University (1999) and a Ph.D. by Stanford University (2004), under Christopher Manning. He attended Oxford on a Marshall Scholarship. In addition to the Marshall scholarship, he has been awarded the ACM's Grace Murray Hopper Award, the Sloan Research Fellowship, the NSF CAREER Award, and the Microsoft New Faculty Fellowship.

References

 

American computer scientists
Grace Murray Hopper Award laureates
1976 births
Living people
UC Berkeley College of Engineering faculty
Alumni of the University of Oxford
Cornell University alumni
Computational linguistics researchers
Natural language processing researchers
Marshall Scholars